Virendra Singh is an Indian politician. He is a member of the Indian National Congress and has been elected Member of Rajasthan Legislative Assembly from Danta Ramgarh Constituency 2018

References